Graça (English: Grace) is a former parish (freguesia) in the municipality of Lisbon, Portugal. At the administrative reorganization of Lisbon on 8 December 2012 it became part of the parish São Vicente.

Main sites
Nossa Senhora do Monte Chapel
Convento das Mónicas
Convento da Graça

References 

Former parishes of Lisbon